Flying Down to Rio is a 1933 American pre-Code RKO musical film famous for being the first screen pairing of Fred Astaire and Ginger Rogers, although Dolores del Río and Gene Raymond received top billing and the leading roles. Among the featured players are Franklin Pangborn and Eric Blore. The songs in the film were written by Vincent Youmans (music), Gus Kahn and Edward Eliscu (lyrics), with musical direction and additional music by Max Steiner. During the initial year that a Best Original Song was given during 7th Academy Awards, the film obtained a nomination for MUSIC (Song) – "Carioca," Music by Vincent Youmans; Lyrics by Edward Eliscu and Gus Kahn [came in 3rd].  Ironically, the song lost to "The Continental" from The Gay Divorcee, the subsequent film of Fred Astaire and Ginger Rogers (the duo now top-billed) after Flying Down to Rio.

The black-and-white film (later computer-colorized) with, according to Arlene Croce's The Fred Astaire and Ginger Rogers Book, a color-tinted sequence, was directed by Thornton Freeland and produced by Merian C. Cooper and Lou Brock. The screenplay was written by Erwin S. Gelsey, H. W. Hanemann and Cyril Hume, based on a story by Lou Brock and a play by Anne Caldwell. Linwood Dunn did the special effects for the celebrated airplane-wing dance sequence at the end of the film. In this film, Dolores del Río became the first major actress to wear a two-piece women's bathing suit onscreen.

Astaire and Rogers made nine musical films at RKO from 1933 to 1939: Flying Down to Rio (1933), The Gay Divorcee (1934), Roberta (1935), Top Hat (1935), Follow the Fleet (1936), Swing Time (1936), Shall We Dance (1937), Carefree (1938), and The Story of Vernon and Irene Castle (1939). The Barkleys of Broadway, their only color film, was produced later at MGM, in 1949.

Plot
Composer Roger Bond (Gene Raymond) and his orchestra are appearing in Miami, with vocalist Honey Hales (Ginger Rogers). Despite the warnings of accordionist and assistant bandleader Fred Ayres (Fred Astaire), Roger is attracted to the beautiful and flirtatious Belinha (Dolores del Río) in the audience. He leaves the bandstand to pursue her.

Dona Elena (Blanche Friderici), Belinha's chaperone, is informed of this, and arranges for Roger and the band to be fired. But Roger pursues Belinha to Brazil, and organizes an engagement for the band at the Hotel Atlântico in Rio de Janeiro, unaware that the hotel is owned by Belinha's father (Walter Walker). Roger persuades Belinha to allow him to fly her there in his private plane, which runs into trouble inflight, forcing a landing on an apparently deserted island. Under the moonlight, she falls into his arms, while admitting to him that she is already engaged.
 
In Rio, Roger informs his good friend Julio (Raul Roulien) that he has fallen in love, but finds out that Belinha is engaged to Julio. During rehearsals for the Hotel's opening (a brief bit of Astaire tap), Fred is told by police that the hotel lacks an entertainment license. When Roger spots a plane overhead, he comes up with the idea of strapping dancing girls to planes, with Fred leading the band and Honey and Julio leading the planes. The show is a great success and the hotel's future guaranteed. Julio gives Belinha up to Roger while Fred and Honey celebrate.

Cast
 Dolores del Río as Belinha De Rezende
 Gene Raymond as Roger Bond
 Raul Roulien as Julio Ribeiro
 Ginger Rogers as Honey Hales
 Fred Astaire as Fred Ayres
 Blanche Friderici as Dona Elena
 Walter Walker, as Belinha's father
 Etta Moten as The Carioca Singer
 Roy D'Arcy as Member Greek Gambling Syndicate
 Maurice Black as Member Greek Gambling Syndicate
 Armand Kaliz as Member Greek Gambling Syndicate
 Paul Porcasi as The Mayor
 Reginald Barlow as Alfredo Vianna (the banker)
 Eric Blore as Mr. Butterbass, Assistant Hotel Manager
 Franklin Pangborn as Hammerstein, Hotel Manager

Music
All the songs in Flying Down to Rio were written by Vincent Youmans (music) and Gus Kahn and Edward Eliscu (lyrics). The dance director was Dave Gould, assisted by Hermes Pan, who went on to become Astaire's primary collaborator.

 "Flying Down to Rio" – sung by Fred Astaire, danced by Ginger Rogers and the chorus
 "Music Makes Me" – sung by Ginger Rogers, some general dancing
 "Orchids in Moonlight" – sung by Raul Roulien, danced (a bit) by Fred Astaire and Dolores del Rio; this became a popular tango song
 "Carioca" – sung by Alice Gentle, Movita Castaneda and Etta Moten, danced by Fred Astaire, Ginger Rogers and the chorus; this is notable for being Astaire and Rogers' first dance together; they dance with their foreheads touching.

Reception
Mordaunt Hall, The New York Times critic, praised the lavish production and called it (along with the Walt Disney short The Night Before Christmas) "a thoroughly enjoyable entertainment." The Variety magazine review was less enthused, complaining that "...Rio's story ... lets it down. It’s slow and lacks laughs to the point where average business seems its groove." However, Astaire was singled out for acclaim, asserting "He's distinctly likeable on the screen, the mike is kind to his voice and as a dancer he remains in a class by himself."

According to RKO records, the film made $923,000 in the United States and Canada and $622,000 elsewhere, resulting in an estimated profit of $480,000.

The film was nominated for the 2006 American Film Institute list AFI's Greatest Movie Musicals, and "Carioca" was nominated for AFI's 100 Years...100 Songs.

The film title was referenced by Roxy Music in their 1972 hit single "Virginia Plain" - "Baby Jane's in Acapulco / We are flying down to Rio".

Ella Shohat argues that the way the film depicted Brazilians homogenized them into a pan-Latin American entity that reflected ethnic stereotyping in American film at the time.

Notes

External links

 
 
 
 
 
 Airplanes Represented in the film Flying Down to Rio

1933 films
1933 musical comedy films
1933 romantic comedy films
American black-and-white films
American musical comedy films
American romantic comedy films
American romantic musical films
Films scored by Max Steiner
Films about aviation accidents or incidents
Films about composers
American films based on plays
Films directed by Thornton Freeland
Films set in Miami
Films set in Rio de Janeiro (city)
RKO Pictures films
Films with screenplays by Cyril Hume
1930s American films